Probabilistic Computation Tree Logic (PCTL) is an extension of computation tree logic (CTL) that allows for probabilistic quantification of described properties. It has been defined in the paper by Hansson and Jonsson.

PCTL is a useful logic for stating soft deadline properties, e.g. "after a request for a service, there is at least a 98% probability that the service will be carried out within 2 seconds". Akin CTL suitability for model-checking PCTL extension is widely used as a property specification language for probabilistic model checkers.

PCTL syntax 
A possible syntax of PCTL can be defined as follows:

Formulas of PCTL are interpreted over discrete Markov chains. An interpretation structure
is a quadruple , where 
 is a finite set of states, 
 is an initial state, 
 is a transition probability function, such that for all  we have , and
 is a labeling function, assigning atomic propositions to states.

A path  from a state  is an infinite sequence of states 
. The n-th state of the path is denoted as 

Probability measure 
A probability measure  on the set of paths with a common prefix of length  is given by the product of transition probabilities along the prefix of the path:

Satisfaction relation 
The satisfaction relation  is inductively defined as follows:
  if and only if ,
  if and only if not ,
  if and only if , and
  if and only if .

See also 
 Computation tree logic
 Temporal logic

References

Temporal logic